The 1993 West Coast Conference men's basketball tournament took place on March 6–8, 1993. All rounds were held in San Francisco, California at the War Memorial Gymnasium.

The Santa Clara Broncos won the WCC Tournament title and an automatic bid to the 1993 NCAA tournament. Steve Nash of Santa Clara was named Tournament MVP.

Format
With eight teams participating, all eight teams were placed into the first round, with teams seeded and paired based on regular-season records. After the first round, teams were re-seeded so the highest-remaining team was paired with the lowest-remaining time in one semifinal with the other two teams slotted into the other semifinal.

Bracket

* - denotes overtime period

References

1992–93 West Coast Conference men's basketball season
West Coast Conference men's basketball tournament
West Coast Athletic Conference men's basketball tournament
West Coast Athletic Conference men's basketball tournament